In the state of New Mexico, the common law felony murder rule is codified in N.M. Stat. Ann. § 30-2-1(2).

Judicial interpretations
The rule was narrowed in State v. Ortega, where the court held that the perpetrator must have the same mens rea as one who commits murder.

References

Murder in New Mexico
U.S. state criminal law
New Mexico law